Whale Beach (formerly also known as Black Sand Beach) is a beach on the eastern shore of Lake Tahoe in Nevada, within the city limits of Carson City. It is known for being a nude beach. It derives its current name from the large rocks near the water's edge.

Location
The beach is south of Secret Harbor Creek Beach and is accessible after a  out-and-back walk from Nevada State Route 28, via Secret Harbor / Whale Beach trail in Toiyabe National Forest.

References 

Lake Tahoe
Beaches of Nevada
Landforms of Carson City, Nevada
Nude beaches
Tourist attractions in Carson City, Nevada